Michael Posner may refer to:

Michael Posner (economist) (1931–2006), British economist and academic
Michael Posner (journalist) (born 1947), Canadian journalist and biographer
Michael Posner (lawyer) (born 1950), American lawyer, human rights activist, federal official
Michael Posner (psychologist) (born 1936), American psychologist
Mike Posner (born 1988), American musician

See also
Posner (disambiguation)